Ernest James Young (28 July 1880  – 21 October 1953) was a Liberal politician. He was a Councillor in Portslade and Member of Parliament for Middlesbrough East for one term in the 1930s. He was the first Headmaster of Harrow County School for Boys, Harrow, Middlesex from 1911 to 1919.

Background
He was born in Sussex, a son of Trayton Young. He was educated privately. He started his career working on a farm. He then became a Builder. In 1908 he married Emily Phoebe Terry of Portslade. During World War One he served as a Sapper in the Royal Engineers. Phoebe died in 1919 aged 39. He became a lecturer, writer and journalist. His published works included 'Speech Building'.

Political career
Young started his parliamentary career in 1917 when he was adopted as prospective Liberal candidate for the newly created division of Hammersmith South. However he did not contest the 1918 general election. He was elected to Portslade-by-Sea Urban District Council. He ran unsuccessfully for Parliament as the Liberal candidate at Jarrow in 1922 and at Rossendale in 1923 and 1924. He also ran in the Scottish constituency of Bothwell in Lanarkshire in March 1926, and in Middlesbrough East in 1929.

In 1931 an economic crisis led to the formation of a National Government led by Labour prime minister Ramsay MacDonald which was initially supported by the Conservative and Liberal parties.  Young was elected as Liberal MP for Middlesbrough East at the 1931 general election as a supporter of the government and a member of the official Liberal party led by Sir Herbert Samuel, defeating the well-known local Labour MP, Ellen Wilkinson in a straight fight. Samuel and the Liberals,  although agreeing to go into the 1931 general election supporting the government became increasingly concerned about the government's abandonment of the traditional Liberal policy of Free Trade and worried about the predominance of the Conservatives in the coalition, soon withdrew from the National Government.  Some Liberals, led by Sir John Simon remained in the government and became known as the Liberal Nationals. Young refused to join this group and stuck with the Samuelite Liberals.

At the 1935 general election therefore, the coalition mantle had passed from Young to the Conservative candidate, Chetwynd-Talbot. In an election where the main fight was between the National Government and a revived Labour Party, Young lost his seat to Labour candidate Alfred Edwards who narrowly beat off the National government challenge. Young finished a poor third place in a three-cornered contest.

Young remained active in the Liberal Party, and was their election agent in Worthing in the 1945 general election. He died in Hove in 1953 aged 73.

Electoral record

References

External links
 

1880 births
Liberal Party (UK) MPs for English constituencies
UK MPs 1931–1935
1953 deaths